The 1883 by-election for Ipswich was held when the sitting Conservative MP Thomas Clement Cobbold died.  It was won by the previous Liberal MP for Ipswich, Henry Wyndham West.  The unsuccessful conservative candidate was William Thomas Charley.

References

1883 elections in the United Kingdom
1883 in England
Ipswich
1883